The following is a list of awards and nominations received by Canadian actor Keanu Reeves throughout his career. He earned his first award, the MTV Movie Award for Most Desirable Male, in 1992 for his performance in Point Break. Two years later, his role as the lead protagonist in Speed won him a Bravo Otto for best actor and the MTV Movie Award for Best On-Screen Duo along with Sandra Bullock. Although he was nominated for the one-off Golden Raspberry Worst of Our First 25 Years Award in 2005 for having seven previous Razzie nominations, his success in the John Wick franchise led to his nominations for the Razzie Redeemer Award in the 2015 and 2020 ceremonies.

Awards and nominations

Notes

References

External links 
 

Reeves, Keanu